The 1986 Maine Black Bears football team was an American football team that represented the University of Maine as a member of the Yankee Conference during the 1986 NCAA Division I-AA football season. In their second and final season under head coach Buddy Teevens, the Black Bears compiled a 7–4 record (3–4 against conference opponents) and tied for fifth place in the Yankee Conference. Tim Cahill and Steve Donahue were the team captains.

Schedule

References

Maine
Maine Black Bears football seasons
Maine Black Bears football